Nationalism in Taiwan may refer to the following:
Taiwanese nationalism, a form of nationalism asserting Taiwan as an independent Taiwanese nation
Chinese nationalism#In Taiwan, a form of nationalism asserting Taiwan as a province within the Chinese nation